Lachen Monastery (also called Ngodrub Choling Gonpa, "Launching Gompa"), built in 1858, is a Nyingma Buddhist monastery near Lachen, Sikkim, northeastern India.

It is home to Lachen Monastic School.

See also 
Buddhism
Gautama Buddha
History of Buddhism in India
Buddhist pilgrimage sites in India

References

External links 
 Appeal from the Lachen Gomchen Rinpoche to protect the Rathong Chu and Bum-Chu rivers
 Lachen 'Ngodub Choling' Monastery Lachen 'Ngodub Choling' Monastery, by Dr. Rohit Reddy, Trover
 Mural at Lachen Monastery
 Buddhist pilgrimage sites in India
 Pilgrims Guide to Buddhist India: Buddhist Sites

Buddhist monasteries in Sikkim
Nyingma monasteries and temples